New Israel (Новый Израиль) was one of the Sektanstvo (sectarian) new religious movements that grew and expanded in the Russian Empire in the late 19th to early 20th century, a branch of the Postniki (fasters).  The movement was the result of the schisms that  split the "Old Israel" (Staroizrail) sect after the death of  Perfil Katasonov. Its founder was a peasant named Mokshin, but it rose to notability only under Mokshin's successor, Vasiliy Semionovitch Lubkov (Василий Семенович Лубков, born December 24, 1869).

In the 1910s, members of the sect emigrated to Uruguay, where they founded the town of San Javier.
 
New Israel was strongly influenced by the Dukhovnye Khristiane movement, and in turn gave rise to two new religious sects called Noviy soyuz duhovnovo Israilia (Новый союз духовного Израиля) and Novohristianskiy soyuz (Новохристианский союз).

Although persecuted in the Soviet Union, the group continues to this day.

Religious views 

The New Israel religion believes that there is only one living true God. The sect rejects the typical view of Mystery in God, and therefore rejects most of traditional practices, while keeping only some. Therefore, the consumption of any type of food including meat is acceptable. Church marriages are replaced with civil marriages. The civil marriage allows the selection of a partner duhovnitsu (духовницу) by the will of God or a leader (prophet), in this case family ties are not considered.

History 

In 1891, Lubkov, who was 22 at the time, declared himself to be the living God and took control over the New Israel. In 1905, under the leadership of Lubkov, the church moved its center of operations to Rostov-on-Don. The church later spread its influence over the south of Russia.

In 1911, Lubkov visited the United States to seek refuge for his followers; however, he did not find the country suitable for his followers. At the same time he met with an Uruguayan consul, Hose Richlingom.

In 1912, two representatives of the Uruguay president, Jose Batlle y Ordoñez, visited the Caucasus to visit the potential immigrants. They so highly appreciated their workmanship and skill that in July 1913 two ships "18 de Julio" and "Taongarupa" brought 300 families to the coast of the river Uruguay 164 kilometers from Montevideo.

From 1913 to 1914, about 2,000 followers (10%) under the leadership of Lubkov immigrated to Uruguay and established a farming town San Javier, Uruguay. There Lubkov set up his very restrictive rules. He confiscated all the possessions of his followers and turned them into essentially one family. If anyone went against him he was told Za okolitsu! (За околицу!), which meant that he was supposed to get his personal belongings and leave the town. The problem was that none of the immigrants, except for Lubkov, knew the local language or socialized with the local people, and therefore had a strong dependence on Lubkov.

In the end of the 1920s, Lubkov arranged for a land grant in eastern Rostov oblast, north of other Spiritual Christians (Dukhobortsy, Molokane, Pryguny) in the Tselinsky District. An about 300 people moved from Uruguay to the Soviet Union, to their village commune along the Manych River which they called New Israel. During Collectivization Soviets renamed it Red October (Krasnyy Oktyabr'). Some families arrived later from Uruguay but settled in other areas of Northern of the Caucasus.

During the World War II the New Israel immigrants sent aid in the form of sweaters through the Red Cross back to the Soviet Union.

In 1972, the Uruguay government repressed the town of San Javier by destroying the local library named after Maksim Gorkiy and burned all the books both in the library and in all the houses. They also arrested many of the graduates from Russian universities. These repressions however did not impact the Uruguay-Moscow relationship, as seen from the fact that Moscow in 1979 put 14 turbines of 135,000 kilowatts each onto the Salto-Grande Power Plant.

References
Petrov, Sergey. "New Israel: Transformation of a Branch of Russian Religious Dissent", Doukhobor Genealogy Website, 29 February 2008.
Daniel H. Shubin, The History of Russian Christianity, Volume III: The Synodal Era and the Sectarians, 1725 to 1894, Algora Publishing (2005), pp. 154ff.

External links 
Новый Израиль (Лубковцы) (Russian)
http://mirslovarei.com/content_rel/Novyj-Izrail-512.html

Khlysts
Heresy in Christianity